The Glanbrook Rangers are a Junior ice hockey team based in Glanbrook, Ontario, Canada.  They are playing in the Provincial Junior Hockey League.  The Rangers are only the second Ontario Hockey Association team to have claimed three consecutive Clarence Schmalz Cups as Junior C champions, winning in 1997, 1998, and 1999. The Rangers have continued to dominate the league including the Grimsby Peach Kings.

History
The Rangers reigned over their league and the Ontario Hockey Association from the 1996-97 season until 1999 with three consecutive Clarence Schmalz Cups as the best Junior C hockey team in Ontario.

Season-by-season record
Note: GP = Games Played, W = Wins, L = Losses, T = Ties, OTL = Overtime Losses, GF = Goals for, GA = Goals against

CSC

Clarence Schmalz Cup appearances
1997: Glanbrook Rangers defeated Belle River Canadiens 4-games-to-2
1998: Glanbrook Rangers defeated Kincardine Bulldogs 4-games-to-1
1999: Glanbrook Rangers defeated Wallaceburg Lakers 4-games-to-none
2018: Lakefield Chiefs defeated Glanbrook Rangers 4-games-to-1

External links
Rangers YouTube Webpage
OHA - Niagara District Website
Rangers Webpage

Niagara Junior C Hockey League teams
Ice hockey teams in Hamilton, Ontario
1975 establishments in Ontario
Ice hockey clubs established in 1975